Janabad or Jonabad in Iran may refer to:
 Janabad, Hamadan
 Janabad, Isfahan
 Janabad, Kohgiluyeh and Boyer-Ahmad
 Janabad, Razavi Khorasan
 Janabad-e Alijafar, Sistan and Baluchestan Province